Kärleksön is a 1977 Swedish pornographic film directed by Joseph W. Sarno, using the pseudonym Hammond Thomas.

Cast
 Leena Hiltunen – Katrin Norrman

References

External links
 
 

1977 films
1970s pornographic films
Films directed by Joseph W. Sarno
Swedish pornographic films
1970s Swedish films